The 1892 Washington Senators season was a season in American professional baseball. The team, which had played in the now-defunct American Association in 1891 as the Washington Statesmen, was purchased by J. Earl Wagner and moved to the National League for the 1892 season. In a split season schedule, the Senators finished seventh in the first half of the season and last in the second half. Overall, the team had a record of 58–93, 10th-best in the 12-team National League.

Preseason
The Senators held spring training in Savannah, Georgia at Bolton Street Park.

Regular season

Opening Day lineup

Season standings

Record vs. opponents

Roster

Player stats

Batting

Starters by position 
Note: Pos = Position; G = Games played; AB = At bats; H = Hits; Avg. = Batting average; HR = Home runs; RBI = Runs batted in

Other batters 
Note: G = Games played; AB = At bats; H = Hits; Avg. = Batting average; HR = Home runs; RBI = Runs batted in

Pitching

Starting pitchers 
Note: G = Games pitched; IP = Innings pitched; W = Wins; L = Losses; ERA = Earned run average; SO = Strikeouts

Other pitchers 
Note: G = Games pitched; IP = Innings pitched; W = Wins; L = Losses; ERA = Earned run average; SO = Strikeouts

References

External links 
 1892 Washington Senators team page at Baseball Reference

Washington Senators (1891–1899) seasons
Washington Senators season
Washington Senators